Variegated yarn is yarn dyed with more than one colour.

Objective 
It can produce effects that vary depending on the technique of the crafter, the pattern used, and the frequency of colour change. These effects include "flashing" (lightning-bolt effects) and "pooling" (patchy or marbleized effects). Some yarns (known as "self-striping yarns") are designed to produce stripes when used to knit small items such as socks or mittens.

Methods 
In solid dyeing, yarns dyed in one single color, Variegated yarns have more than one color. There are various methods of applying two or more colors, and the most common practice is spray or space dyeing.

Space dyeing 
Space dyeing is a technique of localized color application that produces a unique multicolored effect.

Use 
Variegated yarns may be used also in knitting, crocheting, and other textile arts. These variegated colored yarns help in making small fancy items such as braids, etc.

Gallery

See also 

 Yarn

 Dyeing

 Novelty yarns include a wide variety of yarns made with unusual features, structure or fiber composition such as slubs, inclusions, metallic or synthetic fibers, laddering and varying thickness introduced during production.

References 

Knitting 
Knitting tools and materials
Yarn